Santa Pola Club de Fútbol is a football team based in Santa Pola in the autonomous community of Valencian Community. Founded in 1980, it plays in the Regional Preferente – Group 4. Its stadium is Municipal Manolo Maciá.

History
U.D. Santa Pola (1968) & Atlético Santa Pola (1976) merged in 1980 as Santa Pola CF

Season to season

9 seasons in Tercera División

Notable former players
 Manolo Maciá

Notable former coaches
 Nino Lema
 Manolo Maciá

External links
Official website
Futbolme.com profile
ffcv.es profile

Football clubs in the Valencian Community
Association football clubs established in 1980
Divisiones Regionales de Fútbol clubs
1980 establishments in Spain